Newbury Rural District was a rural district in Berkshire, England from 1894 to 1974, covering an area in the south-west of the county which almost surrounded but did not include the town of Newbury.

Evolution
The district had its origins in the Newbury Rural Sanitary District. This had been created under the Public Health Act 1872, giving public health and local government responsibilities for rural areas to the existing boards of guardians of poor law unions. The Newbury Rural Sanitary District covered the area of the Newbury Poor Law Union with the exception the town of Newbury, which was a municipal borough and so formed its own urban sanitary district. The poor law union and rural sanitary district were administered from Newbury Union Workhouse, which had been built in 1836 on Newtown Road in Newbury.

Under the Local Government Act 1894, rural sanitary districts became rural districts from 28 December 1894. The act also directed that rural districts should not straddle county boundaries, and parishes should not straddle district boundaries. The Newbury Rural Sanitary District had included the parish of Newtown in Hampshire; it was decided before the act came into force that Newtown would transfer to the Kingsclere Rural District to allow it to stay in Hampshire. The parishes of Greenham and Speen had previously been partly within the municipal borough of Newbury and partly outside it, but they had their boundaries adjusted to add the parts within the borough to the parish of Newbury.

Parishes
Newbury Rural District contained the following civil parishes:

Premises
Newbury Rural District Council held its first meeting on 3 January 1895 at Newbury Town Hall, when Albert Richard Tull of Crookham House, Thatcham, was appointed the first chairman of the council. He was a Conservative, and had been the previous chairman of the board of guardians.

In its early years, the council generally met at the workhouse on Newtown Road, Newbury. Around 1929 the council moved to Phoenix House at 50 Bartholomew Street, Newbury, converting it for use as both offices and meeting place. The council remained at Phoenix House until its abolition in 1974.

Abolition
Newbury Rural District was abolished under the Local Government Act 1972, becoming part of the new district of Newbury on 1 April 1974, which in turn became West Berkshire in 1998.

Notes

References

Districts of England created by the Local Government Act 1894
Districts of England abolished by the Local Government Act 1972
Rural districts of England
Former districts of Berkshire